Zaporizhzhia Oblast Football Federation is a football governing body in the region of Zaporizhzhia Oblast, Ukraine. The federation is a member of the Football Federation of Ukraine.

Previous Champions

1939    FC Lokomotyv Zaporizhzhia (1)
1940    FC Lokomotyv Zaporizhzhia (2)
1941-44 World War II
1945    FC Lokomotyv Zaporizhzhia (3)
1946    FC Bilshovyk Zaporizhzhia (1)
1947    FC Torpedo Osypenko (1)
1948    FC Torpedo Osypenko (2)
1949    FC Stal Zaporizhzhia (1)
1950    FC Metalurh Zaporizhya (2)
1951    FC Strila Zaporizhzhia (1)
1952    FC Mashynobudivnyk Zaporizhzhia (1)
1953    FC Mashynobudivnyk Zaporizhzhia (2)
1954    FC Mashynobudivnyk Zaporizhzhia (3)
1955    FC Mashynobudivnyk Zaporizhzhia (4)
1956    FC Burevisnyk Melitopol (1)
1957    FC Burevisnyk Melitopol (2)
1958    FC Avanhard Velykyi Tokmak (1)
1959    FC Mashynobudivnyk Zaporizhzhia (5)
1960    FC Burevisnyk Melitopol (3)
1961    FC Burevisnyk Melitopol (4)
1962    FC Azovets Berdyansk (1)
1963    FC Strila Zaporizhzhia (2)
1964    FC Strila Zaporizhzhia (3)
1965    FC Strila Zaporizhzhia (4)
1966    FC Strila Zaporizhzhia (5)
1967    FC Tytan Zaporizhzhia (1)
1968    FC Meteor Zaporizhzhia (1)
1969    FC Torpedo Melitopol (1)
1970    FC Tytan Zaporizhzhia (2)
1971    FC Tytan Zaporizhzhia (3)
1972    FC Hirnyk Dniprorudne (1)
1973    FC Hirnyk Dniprorudne (2)
1974    FC Komunar Zaporizhzhia (1)
1975    FC Transformator Zaporizhzhia (1)
1976    FC Transformator Zaporizhzhia (2)
1977    FC Tytan Zaporizhzhia (4)
1978    FC Start Zaporizhzhia (1)
1979    FC Start Zaporizhzhia (2)
1980    FC Tytan Zaporizhzhia (5)
1981    FC Start Zaporizhzhia (3)
1982    FC Hirnyk Dniprorudne (3)
1983    FC Khimik Zaporizhzhia (1)
1984    FC Torpedo Melitopol (2)
1985    FC Krystal Zaporizhzhia (1)
1986    FC Transformator Zaporizhzhia (3)
1987    FC Torpedo Berdyansk (3)
1988    FC Enerhiya Berdyansk (1)
1989    FC Transformator Zaporizhzhia (4)
1990    FC Metalurh Zaporizhzhia (3)
1991    FC Orbita Zaporizhzhia (1)
1992    FC Torpedo Melitopol (3)
1992-93 FC Viktor Zaporizhia (1)
1993-94 ???
1994-95 FC ZAlK Zaporizhzhia (1)
1995-96 ???
1996-97 FC ZAlK Zaporizhzhia (2)
1997-98 FC ZAlK Zaporizhzhia (3)
1998-99 FC ZAlK Zaporizhzhia (4)
1999 fa FC ZAlK Zaporizhzhia (5)
2000    FC ZAlK Zaporizhzhia (6)
2001    FC Roza Vitriv Hulyaipole (1)
2002    FC ZAlK Zaporizhzhia (7)
2003    FC ZAlK Zaporizhzhia (8)
2004    FC ZIGMU-Spartak Zaporizhzhia (2)
2005    FC Petrivka Petrivske (1)
2006    FC Dynamo Zaporizhzhia (1)
2007    FC Illich-Osypenko (1)
2008    FC Illich-Osypenko (2)
2009    FC Illich-Osypenko (3)
2010    FC Motor Zaporizhzhia (6)
2011    FC Melitopolska chereshnya (1)
2012    FC Motor-Sich Zaporizhzhia (7)
2013    FC Melitopolska chereshnya (2)
2014    FC Tavria-Skif Rozdol (1)
2015    FC Tavria-Skif Rozdol (2)
2016    FC Tavria-Skif Rozdol (3)
2017    FC Tavria-Skif Rozdol (4)
2018    FC Motor Zaporizhzhia (8)
2019    FC Motor Zaporizhzhia (9)
2020    FC Motor Zaporizhzhia (10)
2021    FC Motor Zaporizhzhia (11)

Top winners
11 – FC Motor Sich (Strila) Zaporizhzhia
 8 – FC ZAlK Zaporizhzhia
 5 – FC Mashynobudivnyk Zaporizhzhia
 5 – FC Tytan Zaporizhzhia
 4 – 3 clubs (Transformator, Burevisnyk M., Tavria-Skif)
 3 – 7 clubs (Illich-Osypenko, Torpedo M., Hirnyk D., Start, Lokomotyv, Torpedo B., Metalurh/Metalurh-2)
 2 – 3 clubs
 1 – 13 clubs

Professional clubs
 FC Bolshevik Zaporizhia, 1946-1947
 FC Lokomotiv Zaporizhia, 1948-1949
 FC Metalurh Zaporizhia, 1953-1967
 FC Spartak Melitopol (Burevestnik), 1963-1966
 FC Torpedo Berdiansk, 1966-1967

See also
 FFU Council of Regions

References

External links
 Zaporizhzhia Oblast. Ukrayinskyi Football 

Football in the regions of Ukraine
Football governing bodies in Ukraine
Sport in Zaporizhzhia Oblast
Zaporizhzhia Oblast Football Championship